Sweep (Released as Wicca in the UK and Ireland) is a series of young adult fantasy novels written by Cate Tiernan, the first of which, Book of Shadows, was published in 2001. The series follows a teenage girl, Morgan Rowlands, who discovers she is the descendant of a long line of witches, and possesses powerful magic of her own.

Plot

Book of Shadows, Book 1

Morgan Rowlands is a high school student living in the picturesque town of Widow's Vale. Morgan is an ordinary girl who lives an ordinary life. However, her life becomes unsettled upon meeting Cal Blaire. With his angelic face, gold-colored eyes, perfect body, and olive skin, Cal quickly becomes the center of every girl’s admiration, including Morgan and her best friend, Bree Warren, who breaks up with her boyfriend, Chris, and Raven (a girl who is popular because she wears heavy metal style and has tattoos). 

Having gained popularity with his air of charisma and good looks, Cal manages to gather several dozen students from his new school to a “homecoming party”. During the party, Cal reveals his Wiccan origins by inviting his peers to join him in a circle to celebrate Mabon, one of the Wiccan Sabbats. Feelings of discomfort and surprise cause many of the guests to leave, but Bree and Morgan decide to stay for the circle. From that moment on, Morgan begins showing a knack for Witchcraft, which sparks Cal's interest. However, as the chemistry between Cal and Morgan becomes more and more apparent a rift in Bree and Morgan’s friendship emerges because of the incident at the pool party when he picks Morgan up in his arms. Later, as the Samhain gathering comes to a close, Cal and his friends form a coven called Cirrus. During this circle, Morgan discovers that she is a "blood witch": a person who is naturally born with magical powers.

The Coven, Volume 2
Upon learning that she is a blood witch, Morgan concludes that her parents are blood witches and confronts them. However, after her parents deny being witches, this leads Morgan to find out that she was adopted. She runs out of the house in a fierce rage finding comfort with Cal. From then on, Cal and Morgan's relationship develops. Cal tells Morgan they were meant to be together. He says he loves her, the rift between Morgan and Bree grows, and Morgan goes on a quest to find her origins.  Due to Cal and Morgan's relationship, Bree and Raven, members of Cirrus, announce their leaving of the coven to a different coven which is headed by Sky Eventide.  Morgan, in the end, meets Sky along with Hunter Niall. At Cal's house. Morgan immediately feels extremely wary around Hunter and Sky upon meeting them. While trying to get away from them, Morgan accidentally stumbles upon Selene's hidden library, where she finds her mother's Book of Shadows.

Blood Witch, Volume 3
Flustered from seeing Sky and Hunter in Cal's home, Morgan, wanting to get away from them, leaves the room and discovers a door hidden in the hallway.  When entering the room, Morgan realizes that it is Selene's study.  While glimpsing the thousands of books that mark the walls, Morgan becomes taken over by a sensation.  Unconsciously, she pulls out a book with no title.  Flipping through the pages she realizes that what she held was her mother's Book of Shadows.  Amidst her overwhelming emotions, Cal and his mother, Selene Belltower, enter, perplexed about how she was able to enter the secret room.  At first feeling guilty, but seeing the Book of Shadows is rightfully hers, Morgan confidently opposes Selene, and without any conflict Selene gives the book to Morgan.  Morgan returns home.  From this point on Cal's respect and feelings begin to grow for Morgan.  Tensions rise and things start to become unclear as little bits and pieces of information arise.  Morgan discovers that she is Woodbane, Hunter is Cal's brother and he is Seeker for the International Council of Witches investigating Selene and Cal. Morgan finds her birth mother's tools beneath their old house in Meshomah Falls, by scrying in the fire she sees her birth mother Maeve Riordan pointing under the house, so she drives there with her best friend Robbie to retrieve it. Further tensions erupt on Morgan's birthday during her time with Cal when Hunter arrives.  Cal and Hunter break into an argument which ends up becoming a chase.  Hunter announces his reason for being there which is to fulfill his duty as Seeker.  Cal runs into the woods with Hunter following behind and Morgan following. Hunter and Cal then fight, resulting to the event of Hunter placing a braigh - a spelled chain meant to hurt witches - on Cal so that he is helpless. Cal begs Morgan to save him, so Morgan throws the athame that Cal gave her for her birthday at Hunter, sending him over the edge of the cliff and into the river.

Dark Magick, Volume 4
On Morgan’s 17th she killed a man. Her guilt at what happened makes her send a witch message to Sky telling her where to find Hunter and that he needed her help. Hours later on the cliff edge she into Sky. Sky says that she can no longer feel Hunter's presence. 
At Practical Magick Alyce says that she needs to bind the tools she found to herself so others cannot easily use them and they will be stronger for her. In Maeve's BOS, she discovers hidden entries about her mother meeting a witch named Ciaran and falling in love with him. 
Selene eagerly asks Morgan about Belwicket's tools and offers to show her how to use them and even share her power with them. When Morgan tells Selene that she has already bound the tools to her, Selene seems displeased and says that they can always do a spell to unbind them. 
Cal's admits that he lied to her about not knowing what clan he was from. He tells her that his line is from a traditional practicing Woodbane clan unlike Belwicket. He then takes her to a secret room out in the pool-house that he calls his seómar. Morgan finds the room uncomfortable and claustrophobic and makes an excuse to leave. Cal tells her that some of his mother’s Woodbane friends want to meet her which fills her with fear she flees to Practical magic.
At Practical Magick, Hunter sitting at the small table. She decides the only way she can trust Hunter is if they connect minds. Morgan learns that Hunter was telling the truth about being a seeker for the council and that he was sent to investigate Cal and Selene for misuse of magick. She could feel Hunter searching her mind for any involvement in dark magick and finding none. 
Sky enters and freaks out when she sees Morgan sitting with Hunter. She screams that if she hadn't got a witch message telling her where to find Hunter, that he would be dead. Morgan is furious with Sky for letting her believe Hunter was dead, and yells back that she had sent the message. Sky doesn't believe her because she says she isn't strong enough, but Hunter speaks up saying that she is. 
Morgan tells Cal about Hunter being alive and he is angry. Hunter comes to her house to re-draw the protection sigils. They talk for a while and look at each other. Hunter grabs her chin and leans in to kiss her. A car door slams before he does, breaking the moment and she pushes a shocked Hunter back.
Morgan does a solo circle she sees visions of her ancestors passing the tools down from generation to generation until a vision of herself then turns and hands them to a tall girl with hazel eyes; her future daughter whom she will call Moira. When she opens her eyes, she finds Sky waiting they end up doing a táth meanma and scrying circle together. During the circle they see Cal and Selene with others discussing her. They say that she was Cals assignment and is his responsibility to bring into the fold, and he responds saying she will come.
Morgan asks Cal if Selene is trying to hurt her and if they are in a Woodbane coven trying to destroy non-Woodbane witches. Cal tells her that they are múirn beatha dán's and that she needs to trust him. She says they are not and realizes that it’s true. 
In an effort to distract him she tells him she knows that he slept with Bree and he finally admits that it did happen once, the news breaking Morgan's heart and she ends their relationship. Cal binds her with a spell and throws her into her own car. She sends witch messages to anyone she can think of begging for help. Cal brings her to his pool-house sanctuary and puts her inside and hits her with a ball of black energy knocking her unconscious.
When she awakens, she is locked in Cal's seómar She hears Selene asking what Cal is doing and he claims he is solving the problem. Cal was burning her alive, just like her mother. She hears Bree and Robbie are outside the burning pool-house looking for her, she yells that she is inside and they take Morgan's car and rams the wall making a hole Morgan can escape through.

Awakening, Volume 5

In Dark Magick Morgan was betrayed by the first boy she ever loved (Cal). Now Morgan must attempt to get on with her life. Morgan begins to study with Hunter, and slowly begins to realize her feelings for him. But dark magick seems to be surrounding them and someone close is to blame. Hunter and Morgan slowly start to get closer throughout the book. Hunter suspects that the dark magick is being used by David Redstone, owner of Practical Magick, and Morgan's friend. Morgan does everything she can to try and prove it was not him, but in the end, Hunter is right. The day before David gets stripped of his powers, Morgan and Hunter share a passionate kiss, and after Hunter strips David of his powers, he gives Morgan the stone Morganite, and it shows that Morgan is the thing/person that Hunter desires most in his heart.

Spellbound, Volume 6
Kithic and Cirrus merge and Morgan becomes aware of her feelings for Hunter.  Throughout the book Morgan and Hunter's relationship develop with an occasional mishap.  The two later find out that the severed brake lines and the sawed posts were the workings of Cal when he admits it upon their meeting at the old Methodist cemetery.  Hunter and Cal at the cemetery prepare to fight when Morgan binds them with a spell.  Keeping the binding spell on the two  of them, she forces Hunter into her car and drives to Hunter's house where she releases him.  If things couldn't get worse, Mary K., Morgan's sister is kidnapped by Selene.  Morgan and Hunter go to Selene's and Cal's old house to battle it out with her.  Just as Selene's magic was about to hit Morgan, Cal appears and steps in front of the dark magick, sacrificing himself for Morgan and ultimately proving to her that he had indeed renounced his mother's beliefs and that he really did love her. Selene falls to the ground, grieving over her son's dead body. While her guard is down, Hunter attempts to put the braigh around her wrists, but she is automatically enveloped by the darkness within her, causing the braigh to corrode. Just when all seems lost, the darkness exits her body, and the physical strain kills Selene. They leave the house, along with Mary K., who doesn't seem to recall any of the events that just occurred. Sky and another person, seemingly a member of the International Council of Witches, then arrive at the house and take Cal and Selene's body away. Morgan is undecided as to her feelings for Hunter.

The Calling, Volume 7
Morgan has a dream about a ritual sacrifice. The Witches Council thinks that it is a vision of the future. They suspect that it is a vision of an illegal sacrifice by a Woodbane coven, Amyranth, to obtain power. It is suspected that the sacrifice may in fact be a child of one of Amyranth's members. The council sends Hunter to New York, the place where the coven is suspected to operate, to investigate. Morgan goes with Hunter; however, she also wishes to discover more about her birth parents, something which can only be done in New York. At the invitation of Bree, they stay at the apartment of Bree's father. Robbie, Sky and Raven come along for the ride.
At a New York disco they meet Killian who turns out to be Ciaran's son. It is then believed that Killian is the target of the Amyranth sacrifice. Ciaran meets Morgan in a shop about witchcraft, and he decides to sacrifice her. He sets a trap for her to steal her powers, but when he finds out Morgan is his daughter he helps Hunter to stop the ritual before it is too late. During the time that the ritual is taking place, Morgan realizes that Hunter is her "mùirn beatha dàn"(soul mate). In the end of the book, Morgan breaks up with Hunter because she finds out that she is Ciaran's daughter, one of the most evil witches of the age, and also her mother's "mùirn beatha dàn", but he killed her, so Morgan believes that she's like poison, and being around Hunter is going to get him killed because both parents are Woodbane, the evil clan of the Seven Great Clans. Although her mother has renounced evil, her father is "the Wiccan version of Hitler."

Changeling, Volume 8
Morgan has broken up with Hunter and has found out that Ciaran is her true birth father, making Killian her half-brother. The council of witches sends Eoife, an elderly witch, to Morgan to ask her for her assistance for the rescue of the Starlocket coven, which the International Council of Witches thinks the mysterious dark wave will strike next. Morgan has to get close to Killian to get closer to Ciaran so she called Killian to Widow's Vale and asked him to contact Ciaran. She feels apprehensive and hesitant about facing Ciaran, but at the same time, has a strange urge to hug him since she has finally found her true father. She refuses to hug the same man that killed her mother Maeve Riordan and Angus, her lover, however. Near the end of the book, she shape shifts into a wolf, with Ciaran, and learns his true name, which can control him. Morgan is faced with a choice between the people she loves and the powerful and seemingly dark magick her father can teach her.

Strife, Volume 9
Morgan gets back together with Hunter, and during a family dinner with Hunter, Mary K finally finds out the truth about what Selene had done to her, and how Selene and Cal died. To make things worse, strange occurrences begin to happen in Morgan's presence. Books begin flying and light bulbs explode, and no one seems to know the cause - thus attributing the blame to Morgan. Morgan's school grades begin to slip and she finds herself having difficulty finding a balance between her school work and a life of Wicca. She is grounded because of it, meaning she cannot go to a circle. At the end, Sky leaves.

Seeker, Volume 10
The tenth book in the Sweep series is not from Morgan's point of view. Instead the book is in Hunter's point of view. Hunter was in a search for his parents who have been missing since Hunter was a child. Hunter receives information about the whereabouts of his parents, which inevitably lead him to Canada. There he finds his father, Daniel Niall, and discovers that his mother died just before Yule, when he was training Morgan. Hunter soon discovers that his father is talking to his mother (who is dead) using a Bith Dearc which is the use of what is considered to be a form of dark magick, against the wishes of Hunter's mother. Hunter must attempt to stop his father from doing this, while investigating a witch by the name of Justine Courceau, a witch collecting the true names of other witches, on the order of the International Council of Witches. He ends up kissing her, and then is faced with the fact that he has to tell Morgan about it.

Origins, Volume 11
Hunter brings his father back to Widows Vale 
Hunter and Morgan reads the memoir of Rose MacEwan's which Hunter acquired while in Canada. Rose MacEwan is a Woodbane ancestor of Morgan and is the first person to have created a Dark Wave (a powerful piece of dark magick which can destroy entire covens). The story is written from Rose's point of view and follows her story as she falls in love, has her heart broken, and turns to dark magic as a means of revenge eventually creating the first Dark Wave, not actually realizing what she was doing at the time.

Eclipse, Volume 12
This book switches perspectives between Morgan and Alisa Soto, who discovers that she is a half-witch with significant power. Morgan, Hunter, Daniel Niall and Alisa join forces to combat a Dark Wave which is heading for them and will destroy themselves and their friends and families. Daniel discovers a way to counteract the dark wave, however any full witch would die in the process. Alisa soon discovers that her half-witch abilities may be the key to defeating the Dark Wave and saving everyone who she knows.

Reckoning, Volume 13

This  book is entirely from Alisa Soto's perspective with the difficulties of finding out she is a blood witch and her weird powers and the added stress from her father and his pregnant girlfriend, Alisa's powers flood Hunter's house. After another heated confrontation with her father, Alisa runs away to Gloucester to meet her Uncle Sam. There she meets her mother's family and reconnects with her roots with the help of family friend Charlie. She finds out the family have been plagued by mysterious mishaps that had been attributed to a curse her great-great-great-great grandmother placed on the family (having lost her mind.)

Full Circle, Volume 14
This book is written from both Hunter and Morgan's points of view and begins tying up loose ends of the past 13 novels. Morgan begins sleep-walking in life-threatening situations and begins having visions of Cal, who is dead, trying to save her. Meanwhile Hunter is faced with a decision of whether or not he wants to work for International Witches Council anymore. The two soon find themselves battling an enemy they thought was dead. The story ends with Morgan boarding a plane to Scotland to join a Wiccan school. Hunter gives her a silver Claddagh ring, as a symbol of his love and devotion to her.

Night's Child, Volume 15
Unlike the previous installments of Sweep, this book is not written in first person. Morgan is now thirty-seven years old. Morgan's husband Colm Byrne, whom she married in April of the same year that Hunter Niall died in a storm at sea, was killed in a car crash whilst on a business trip to London. Morgan has otherwise lived in peace working as a healer for the New Charter, and preparing to become the High Priestess of the reformed coven of Belwicket. Morgan has a child, Moira whom she believes is Colm Byrne, her husband and her child, but in reality is not. Upon the actions of another coven, Ealltuinn, Morgan begins to realize that there are dark forces once again being built against her. As Morgan discovers that Hunter is still alive, she sets out to find him. She receives messages leading to Hunter's location. She rescues him by fighting yet another Dark Wave. She then discovers Moira in reality is Hunter's child.

Main characters

Morgan Rowlands
Morgan lives in Widow's Vale, New York and is a high-school junior when the series begins. She is introduced to Wicca when Cal Blaire comes to her school as a senior. The two develop an emotional relationship which only grows stronger during The Coven, in which Morgan discovers her heritage, powers, and family origins. Morgan loses her best friend, Bree Warren, when Cal's affection toward Morgan becomes apparent. They remain enemies until their friendship is rekindled in Awakening. In The Coven, a Seeker from the International Council of Witches comes to Widow's Vale to stop Cal and his mother from performing dark magick. The Seeker, Hunter Niall, is also Cal's half brother. Not fully understanding the situation Morgan almost kills Hunter while trying to protect Cal. Cal's intentions to get Morgan to join the dark side becomes apparent. Morgan fears this and refuses him. Cal fully realizing his feelings for he tries to save her by killing her. Morgan escapes death thanks to Hunter, Bree, and Robbie(another friend). Morgan later falls in love with Hunter and later finds out he is her muirn beatha dan, it is the Wiccan term for soul mate. From there onwards, Morgan uncovers more family secrets, allies, foes, and the full extent of her hereditary powers. Her birth mother had pyrokinetic powers, and Morgan inherited them from her. Pyrokinesis is a rare ability among blood witches. She can also shape-shift, another rare ability inherited from her birth father. In Eclipse, Ciaran says that Morgan is the Sgiùrs dàn, meaning "destroyer", who will drastically change the future and course for the Woodbane clan. By the fourteenth book, she overcomes the darkness, allowing her and Hunter to be together. However, in Night's Child, Hunter is assumed to have died. By this book, Morgan is 37 and a widow of Colm Byrne, a witch in her coven, Belwicket. She loves him, but not as much as she loved Hunter. She has a daughter named Moira who is Hunter's child. Morgan, Sky, and Moira set off to find Hunter on an island. Then a dark wave comes which they fight off. One year later, around Yule, Hunter asks for Morgan's hand in marriage for the second time. She says yes.

Cal Blaire
Cal, or Calhoun is a fairly main character for some of the books. His craft name is "Sgàth", which is Gaelic for "darkness". He is son to the legendary Selene Belltower and Daniel Niall, and half brother to Hunter, Alwyn and Linden Niall. He is 18 years old and described as tanned with shaggy dark hair; Morgan compares him to a God. He moves to Widow's Vale in "Book of Shadows" where he meets Morgan and her friends. He forms a coven, called "Cirrus", with Morgan and other students attending Widow's Vale High School. During their weekly circles he starts to realize Morgan's potential and when his mother, Selene Belltower, a witch of great dark power, comes to learn of Morgan's power and past, she orders Cal to get close to her. Everything is running smoothly for Cal, until his half brother, Hunter, a Seeker for the International Council of Witches arrives. Cal leads Morgan to believe that Hunter is evil and they get themselves into trouble when they come to a deadly confrontation with him. Cal soon falls for Morgan and realizing he can't protect her from his mother's plans for her he tried to kill her. He comes back in "Spellbound" to win back Morgan's heart but Hunter has already shown her Cal's true colors. At the end of this book he saves Morgan from his mother by sacrificing his life in love.

Hunter Niall

Hunter Niall is one of the important main characters in the Sweep series. His craft name is "Gìomanach" which means "Hunter". He is described as tall, thin and lean, with short blond hair and stunning green eyes.He is accused of killing one of his brothers from calling up a taibhs when really his brother had done it himself to find their parents. Hunter then joins the member of the International Council of Witches at the age of 17, half brother of Cal Blaire, son of Fiona and Daniel Niall, brother to Alwyn and Linden, cousin to Sky Eventide and Morgan's "mùirn beatha dàn" (soul mate) Their relationship doesn't start off well as Cal and Selene lead Morgan to believe he's evil. But Morgan is left conflicted when both Hunter and her mutually partaking in a tàth meànma (after Hunter survives falling off a cliff into a river with Morgan's athame in his neck, that Morgan, whilst trying to save Cal threw at Hunter) at Practical Magick and she sees he isn't who she thought he was. Once Cal leaves there is obvious chemistry between the pair and during the series Hunter evolves and develops into the central figure in Morgan's life. Hunter later proposes to Morgan and she says yes. He is then taken by evil witches which leaves Morgan to believe Hunter is dead. Morgan finds out Hunter is still alive so she and her daughter Moira, who believes she is the daughter of Colm Byrne (Morgan's late husband) but is really Hunter's daughter, go to save Hunter from the dark witches. After Hunter is saved he proposes to Morgan again and Morgan accepts.

Sky Eventide
Sky is Hunter's cousin and best friend who came with him to Widow's Vale to look out for him. She, too, is from England, and her craft name is "Athar", Gaelic for "sky". She leads the Widow's Vale coven "Kithic", which receives Bree and Raven as transfers from "Cirrus" after Bree's altercation with Morgan. Later the two covens combine. Sky is bisexual, and she falls in love with Raven, a classmate of Morgan's and a member of Cirrus and Kithic; the two maintain a tumultuous on-and-off relationship until Killian, Morgans half brother came by and destroyed their relationship slowly. Sky and Raven broke up and Sky went to England to visit her family after all, she needed that after what she faced in Widows Vale with Raven. Sky also helps Morgan through her Wiccan education and works at a record store. She is often described as an intense, reserved and arrogant person, but Hunter, who knows her best, describes her as loyal, wise and loving. She is constantly described as protective over Hunter and she, too, comes back in "Night's Child" to help Morgan and Moira to find him again.....

Alisa Soto
Alisa is a half-blood witch with the powers of a full-blood witch. Initially, she was afraid of Wicca, but when she finds out she is part witch, she forces herself to confront her powers. She finds her mother's Book of Shadows after Morgan receives it from the owner of the store "Practical Magick". Within the Book of Shadows, Alisa finds out that her mother, Sarah Curtis, had stripped herself of her powers in fear of them, which inadvertently resulted in Alisa inheriting those powers. It turns out that in Alisa's family, the firstborn female is cursed with uncontrollable telekinesis. Alisa also possesses this power and, as it is later revealed, so does her grandmother. Alisa meets her mother's family later in the series and even receives her mother's tools from her grandmother.

Ciaran MacEwan

Ciaran is the "mùirn beatha dàn"(soulmate) of Maeve Riordan (Morgan's birth mother)and also the birth father of Morgan. He later killed Maeve and her lover Angus when she refused to be with him. He is also in one of the most powerful Woodbane covens named "Amyranth" who perform dark magick. And he is the leader of the coven. He is known as one of the most dangerous witches in the world, and people are afraid of him. Ciaran captured Morgan and intended to kill her and steal her powers. One of his coven members found a watch on Morgan that he had given to Maeve as a present. As soon as Morgan had told him that she was Maeve's daughter it was unbearable for him to think that Maeve and Angus had borne a child. He performs tath meanma on Morgan and discovers that she is in fact his daughter. During the tath meanma, he witnessed Morgan's birth and her mother saying "You have your father's eyes." when in fact, Maeve's lover, Angus, had blue eyes and Morgan has brown, like Ciaran. In that moment Hunter comes in to save Morgan and Ciaran disappears with Hunter. The other coven members continued with the ritual. Hunter comes in again saved her with the help of Ciaran. The next time Morgan saw Ciaran was in Widows Vale they both shape-shifted into wolves. She had put a watch sigil on him to track him. After a while he contacted Morgan through a vision and said he would go to Widows Vale to meet her once again. When Ciaran went to Widows Vale he asked Morgan to join forces with him but she always declined. Until she called him and the night that she called him he was stripped of his powers.

Other characters
 Bree Warren (Morgan's best friend and girlfriend to be of Robbie)
 Robbie Gurevitch (Morgan's other best friend and boyfriend to be of Bree Warren)
 Mary Grace Rowlands (Morgan's adoptive mother)
 Sean Rowlands (Morgan's adoptive father)
 Mary Kathleen Rowlands (Daughter of Mary Grace and Sean Rowlands, and Morgan's non-biological sister)
 Maeve Riordan (Morgan's birth mother, Wiccan name Bradhadair meaning fire fairy, coven was Belwicket)
 Daniel Niall (Father of Cal Blaire, Hunter, Linden and Alwyn uncle of sky eventide)
 Fiona Niall (Mother of Hunter, Linden, and Alwyn)
 Linden Niall (Son of Fiona and Daniel Niall)
 Alwyn Niall (Daughter of Fiona and Daniel Niall)
 Raven Meltzer (Promiscuous acquaintance of Morgan's)
 Selene Belltower (Mother of Cal Blaire)
 Angus Bramson (Maeve Riordan's thought to be lover but actually is just partners)
 Alyce Fernbrake (Friend of Morgan and owner of the Practical Magick store)
 David Redstone (Friend of Morgan and ex-owner of the Practical Magick store)
 Killian MacEwan (Morgan's half brother and Ciaran's youngest son)
 Kyle MacEwan (Morgan's other half brother and Ciaran's oldest son)
 Iona MacEwan (Morgan's half sister and Ciaran's daughter)
 Rose MacEwan (Morgan's ancestor and the first person to cast a dark wave)
 Diarmuid (Rose MacEwan's lover)
 Colm Byrne (Morgan's dead husband and Moira's supposive father)
 Moira Byrne (Morgan and Hunter's daughter) 
 Katrina Byrne (Moira's adoptive grandmother)
 Mackenna Riordan (Morgan's grandmother and former leader of Belwicket)
 Sky Eventyde  (Hunter's Cousin)
 Sarah Curtis (Alisa's mother)
 Justine Courceau (Hunter is assigned to her due to her misuse of magick)
 Ian Delaney (boyfriend of Moira Byrne)
 Lilith Delaney (mother of Ian high priestess of her coven)
 Charlie (boyfriend of Alisa Soto's cousin)

The Series

Footnotes

See also

Balefire
Circle Of Three
Daughters of the Moon

External links
 Publisher cancels Wicca-themed children’s book series. Helsingin sanomat, international edition 9.6.2010.

Fantasy books by series
Witchcraft in written fiction
Contemporary fantasy novels